Russel James Gibb (June 15, 1931 – April 30, 2019) was an American rock concert promoter, school teacher and disc jockey from Dearborn, Michigan, best known for his role in the "Paul is dead" phenomenon, a story he broke on radio station WKNR-FM in Dearborn, and as the owner of the Grande Ballroom, a major rock music venue in Detroit.

Education

Gibb graduated from Michigan State University, earning a degree in educational radio and television administration in 1953.

Career

Teaching

Gibb began teaching elementary school English in the Dearborn School District in 1961. In 1976, he began teaching TV and video production at Dearborn High School. He retired in 2004, having spent 42 years teaching in the Dearborn public schools. For 16 years, he produced the student run cable video show Back Porch Video.

Disk jockey

Gibb started his broadcast career as a weekend TV floor manager at WWJ-TV in Detroit. He did some weekend disc jockey work for WBRB in Mount Clemens, Michigan. Then, he worked at WKMH. 

Gibb worked as a disk jockey at WKNR-FM, when the station was transitioning from a Top 40 format to a hard rock format. His on air nickname was "Uncle Russ". On October 12, 1969, a caller to his show told Gibb about the "Paul is dead" rumor and its clues. The rumor had been circulating sporadically for two years, but had not yet attracted much attention. Gibb and other callers discussed the rumor on the air for the next hour. Two days after the WKNR broadcast, The Michigan Daily published a satirical review of Abbey Road by University of Michigan student Fred LaBour under the headline "McCartney Dead; New Evidence Brought to Light". It identified various clues to McCartney's death on Beatles album covers, including new clues from the just-released Abbey Road LP. As LaBour had invented many of the clues, he was astonished when the story was picked up by newspapers across the United States. 

Gibb further fueled the rumor with a special two-hour program on the subject, "The Beatle Plot", which aired on October 19, 1969. This show has been called "infamous", a "fraud" and a "mockumentary". It brought enormous worldwide publicity to Gibb and WKNR.

Rock music promoter

In the early 1960s, Gibb supplemented his teaching income by producing weekend sock hops at a rented union hall under the name the Pink Pussycat.

In 1966, Gibb opened the Grande Ballroom in Detroit, and was a major player in the late 1960s and early 1970s Detroit music scene. He hired psychedelic poster artists Gary Grimshaw and  Carl Lundgren to help promote his shows. Most major rock acts of that era performed at the Grande Ballroom, some many times.  He closed the Grande Ballroom in 1972.  He was instrumental in giving the MC5, Ted Nugent and Iggy Pop their start. The Grande Ballroom also was where The Who played their rock opera, Tommy, for the first time in the United States. Gibb also owned and leased other live music venues around the Midwest including the Eastown Theatre, Michigan Theater (where the New York Dolls played), and the Birmingham Palladium. He invested in the rock magazine Creem in 1969.

Gibb was one of the promoters of the Goose Lake International Music Festival in 1970, which attracted a crowd of 200,000 people.

Cable TV investor

In 1970, Gibb traveled to England and spent some time staying with Mick Jagger. He was impressed with Jagger's advanced home video system. This led to his interest in cable TV. Gibb bought the Dearborn, Michigan; Wayne, Michigan; and Grosse Pointe, Michigan cable licenses in the late 1970s. When he sold his interests in the 1980s, he became a millionaire.

The Bicentennial
During the administration of Gerald Ford, he worked on the United States Bicentennial Commission as the National Director of Youth and Education.

References

Bibliography
Andru J. Reeve. Turn Me On, Dead Man (2004) 
David A. Carson. Grit, Noise, and Revolution: The Birth of Detroit Rock 'n' Roll (2006) 
Tom Wright. Roadwork: Rock and Roll Turned Inside Out (2007)

External links

People from Dearborn, Michigan
Fordson High School alumni
1931 births
2019 deaths
Music promoters
Educators from Michigan